The men's discus throw event was part of the track and field athletics programme at the 1924 Summer Olympics. The competition was held on Sunday, July 13, 1924. 32 discus throwers from 18 nations competed. The maximum number of athletes per nation was 4. The event was won by Bud Houser of the United States, the nation's fourth victory in the men's discus throw (and first since 1908); the Americans had medalled in each of the Olympic discus throw events to date. Houser had also won the shot put. Vilho Niittymaa took silver, keeping Finland on the podium in the event for the third straight Games. Thomas Lieb gave the United States its second discus throw medal of 1924, with his bronze.

Background

This was the seventh appearance of the event, which is one of 12 athletics events to have been held at every Summer Olympics. The three medalists from 1920 all returned: gold medalist Elmer Niklander and silver medalist Armas Taipale of Finland, and bronze medalist Gus Pope of the United States.

Brazil, Estonia, Ireland, Latvia, Portugal, Poland, Spain, Switzerland, and Yugoslavia each made their debut in the men's discus throw. The United States made its seventh appearance, having competed in every edition of the Olympic men's discus throw to date.

Competition format

The competition continued to use the single, divided-final format in use since 1896. Each athlete received three throws, with the top six receiving an additional three throws.

Records

These were the standing world and Olympic records (in metres) prior to the 1924 Summer Olympics.

In the qualification Bud Houser set a new Olympic record with 46.155 metres.

Schedule

Results

The best six throwers, all three groups counted together, qualified for the final. The throwing order and the throwing series are not available. The final was held on the same day. No competitor was able to improve his mark from the qualification.

References

Sources
 
 

Men's discus throw
Discus throw at the Olympics